Arthur Cartlidge (12 June 1880 – 1922) was an English footballer who played in the Football League for Aston Villa and Stoke as well as spending seven years at Bristol Rovers.

Career
Cartlidge was born in Stoke-upon-Trent and played amateur football with Penkell Victoria and Market Drayton Town before joining Stoke in 1899. He played ten matches for Stoke in two seasons before joining Bristol Rovers.

On 3 May 1901 he joined Bristol Rovers from Stoke, where he remained for seven years, making 258 appearances in the Southern League and winning the league title during the 1904–05 season. He left Bristol in April 1908 to join Aston Villa playing 55 times, before returning to Stoke in 1911 to play in the Southern League for two more years. He ended his career with South Shields.

Career statistics
Source:

References

English footballers
Market Drayton Town F.C. players
Aston Villa F.C. players
Bristol Rovers F.C. players
Stoke City F.C. players
South Shields F.C. (1889) players
English Football League players
1880 births
1922 deaths
Association football goalkeepers